She Lay Gutted is the second studio album by American death metal band Disgorge. It was released by Unique Leader Records in November, 1999 and re-released on February 21, 2006 by Crash Music Inc. Back-up vocals on the album are performed by Erik Lindmark of Deeds of Flesh.

Track listing
 "Revelations XVIII" – 3:31
 "She Lay Gutted" – 2:40
 "Exhuming the Disemboweled" – 3:01
 "Compost Devourment" – 1:52
 "Sodomize the Bleeding" – 3:05
 "False Conception" – 2:50
 "Womb Full of Scabs" – 2:24
 "Disfigured Catacombs" – 2:37
 "Purifying the Cavity" – 2:50

Unique Leader Records albums
1999 albums
Disgorge (American band) albums